Sigma Delta Tau is an American sorority and member of the National Panhellenic Conference. Sigma Delta Tau was founded on March 25, 1917 at  Cornell University by Jewish women. However, there is no religious requirement for membership to the sorority, and it prides itself on being inclusive of all, as well as being historically Jewish. Sigma Delta Tau has over 70,000 initiates from 105 chapters  around the United States.

History 
Sigma Delta Tau was founded on March 25, 1917 at Cornell University by seven Jewish women: Dora Bloom Turteltaub, Amy Apfel Tishman, Marian Gerber Greenberg, Grace Srenco Grossman, Inez Dane Ross, Regene Freund Cohane and Lenore Rubinow. The original name, Sigma Delta Phi, was changed after the women discovered a sorority with the same name already existed.

Symbols 
The sorority's official flower is the golden tea rose and its jewel is lapis lazuli. The colors of Sigma Delta Tau are cafe au lait and old blue. The sorority's symbol is the torch, which is also the name of its national publication.

The current badge is a jeweled gold torch. On the front of the torch are the Greek letters ΣΔΤ, with six pearls and a diamond. The badge is worn as an emblem of membership by initiated members. Uninitiated members wear a different badge, a gold torch enameled in old blue.

Philanthropy 
The current national philanthropies of Sigma Delta Tau are Prevent Child Abuse America, the Sigma Delta Tau Foundation, and Jewish Women International.

Prevent Child Abuse America was selected as Sigma Delta Tau's National Philanthropy in 1982. Each Sigma Delta Tau chapter conducts an annual service project, educational program or major fund raiser for the benefit of Prevent Child Abuse America. Since 1982, Sigma Delta Tau has donated more than $3 million to PCAA.

The Sigma Delta Tau Foundation was chosen as an official philanthropic partner in 2017.

Chapters 

Sigma Delta Tau currently has a total of 64 active collegiate chapters across North America.

Membership 
The national president of Sigma Delta Tau is voted on by the chapters and National Council Members every two years.

Notable alumnae 
Joyce Brothers (Alpha chapter, Cornell University) – psychologist, television and radio personality, writer 
Arielle Charnas (Omega chapter, Syracuse University) – influencer and creative director of SomethingNavy
Meredith Deane (Alpha Xi chapter, Boston University; Mu chapter, University of Southern California) – actress
Heather Dubrow (Omega chapter, Syracuse University) – actress and cast member of The Real Housewives of Orange County
Sherry Lansing (Sigma chapter, Northwestern University) – actress, CEO of Paramount Pictures, president of production at 20th Century Fox
Christy Carlson Romano – (Gamma Tau chapter, Columbia University/Barnard College) – Broadway and television actress
Flo Steinberg (Psi chapter, University of Massachusetts Amherst) – publisher with Big Apple Comix
Remy Zaken (Gamma Tau chapter, Columbia University/Barnard College) – Broadway actress 
Bari Lurie (Alpha Tau chapter, George Washington University) – non-profit executive
Carol Saline (Omega chapter, Syracuse University) – journalist, broadcaster, and award-winning author

See also 
List of social fraternities and sororities
List of Jewish fraternities and sororities

References 

 
1917 establishments in New York (state)
Cornell University
National Panhellenic Conference
Student societies in the United States
Student organizations established in 1917
Historically Jewish sororities in the United States
Jewish organizations established in 1917
Fraternities and sororities based in Indianapolis